Corybas limpidus, commonly known as the crystal helmet orchid, is a species of terrestrial orchid endemic to Western Australia. It has round or heart-shaped leaf and a translucent greenish flower with dark red or burgundy-coloured spots and blotches. The edges of the labellum have a few short, blunt teeth.

Description 
The leaf is green on the upper surface and silvery green on the lower side. The edges of the labellum have a few short, blunt teeth. Flowering occurs in August and September.

Taxonomy 
Corybas limpidus was first formally described in 1991 by David Jones, in Australian Orchid Research, based on specimens collected near Albany in 1986. The specific epithet (limpidus) is a Latin word meaning "clear", "transparent" or "pure", referring to the dorsal sepal and part of the labellum.

In 2002, David Jones and Mark Clements proposed splitting Corybas into smaller genera and placing this species into Corysanthes but the change has not been widely accepted.

Distribution and habitat
The crystal helmet orchid grows under dense shrubs between sand dunes in coastal areas from Esperance to Walpole in the Esperance Plains, Jarrah Forest and Warren biogeographic regions.

Conservation
Corybas limpidus is classified as "Priority Four" by the Government of Western Australia Department of Parks and Wildlife, meaning that is rare or near threatened.

References 

limpidus
Endemic orchids of Australia
Orchids of Western Australia
Plants described in 1991